Bruce Woodcock may refer to:
Bruce Woodcock (boxer) (1920–1997), English heavyweight boxer
Bruce Woodcock (computer games analyst) (born 1970), American computer games analyst